Pakshiraja Studios was a motion picture movie studio in Coimbatore, Tamil Nadu, India, established by S. M. Sriramulu Naidu in 1945. The studio predominantly produced movies in Tamil, Telugu, Hindi and Malayalam languages, also having made one Kannada film. The studio had major releases in the 1950s and early 1960s and is well known for some blockbusters of the times.

History
During the early 1930s, Coimbatore became a hub for some of the south Indian language movies, especially Tamil and Telugu, when the director Naidu and other industrialists started Central Studios. Naidu became the creative head and started making his own movies under the banner of Pakshiraja Films. By the early 1930s, another movie studio, Premier Cinetone Studio was under operation in Red Fields, Coimbatore. In 1945, Naidu left Central Studios and took over the Premier Cinetone Studio located in Puliyakulam Road, Red Fields, Coimbatore. He onstructed new floors and infrastructure and made it a fully-fledged movie studio with in-house processing lasoratories.

Popular movies
The most popular films from that studio was  Malaikkallan (1955), starring M. G. R and P. Bhanumathi, and Azaad (1955) starring Dilip Kumar and Meena Kumari, which was the highest grossing film in Bollywood for that year, as well as Kumar and Kumari's first in lighter roles as against their tragic roles in most other movies. Malaikkallan was M. G. Ramachandran's first major box office hit.

Present status
Novie production in the studio slowly declined since mid 1960s. With Central Studios going out of movie industry some time earlier and declining production at Salem Modern Theaters, Chennai has become the de facto capital for the south Indian movie industry. In 1970, Sriramulu relocated his studio facilities to establish Chamundeshwari Studios in Bangalore.

The studio premises and structures still remain more or less intact with several other establishments housed inside.

List of movies
Movies listed here are partial list only.

References

 Baker-turned filmmaker - The Hindu article
 Naidu: Hits & Misses - The Hindu (Randoor Guy)
 Reel-time nostalgia
 Movie Review - Maragatham
 Projecting cinema The Hindu

External links
 

1945 establishments in India
Film production companies of Tamil Nadu
Indian film studios
Hindi cinema
Companies based in Coimbatore
Filmfare Awards winners
Film production companies based in Coimbatore